Şipca may rever to several places in Moldova:

 Şipca, a commune in Șoldănești District
 Şipca, a commune in Transnistria